The Edward N. and Mary T. Stebbins House is located in Barron, Wisconsin, United States. It was added to the National Register of Historic Places for its architectural significance in 2006.

History
The house was built by Edward and Mary Stebbins, who moved to Barron in 1891. Edward died in 1903 and his widow sold the house in 1907. It has five bedrooms, a garden house, and a carriage house, and at times was used as a bed and breakfast.

References

Bed and breakfasts in Wisconsin
Colonial Revival architecture in Wisconsin
Houses completed in 1897
Houses on the National Register of Historic Places in Wisconsin
Houses in Barron County, Wisconsin
National Register of Historic Places in Barron County, Wisconsin